North Whitehall Township is a township in Lehigh County, Pennsylvania. The population of North Whitehall Township was 15,655 at the 2020 census. It is a suburb of Allentown in the Lehigh Valley, which had a population of 861,899 and was the 68th most populous metropolitan area in the U.S. as of the 2020 census.

Geography
The township is in northeastern Lehigh County. It is drained by the Lehigh River, which separates it from Northampton County.

The township has a hot-summer humid continental climate (Dfa) and the hardiness zone is 6b.

North Whitehall's villages include Ballietsville, Coffeetown, Ironton, Kernsville, Laurys Station, Mechanicsville (also in South Whitehall Township), Meyersville (also in South Whitehall), Neffs (also in Washington Township), Orefield (also in South Whitehall), Ormrod, Ruchsville, Scheidy, and Schnecksville.

Adjacent municipalities
Whitehall Township (east)
South Whitehall Township (south)
Upper Macungie Township (tangent to the southwest)
Lowhill Township (west)
Heidelberg Township (west)
Washington Township (northwest)
Lehigh Township, Northampton County (north)
Allen Township, Northampton County (northeast)
Northampton, Northampton County (tangent to the east)

Demographics

As of the census of 2010, there were 15,703 people, 5,766 households, and 4,453 families residing in the township.  The population density was 543.4 people per square mile (209.8/km2).  There were 6,000 housing units at an average density of 207.6/sq mi (80.2/km2).  The racial makeup of the township was 94.71% White, 1.53% African American, 0.12% Native American, 1.34% Asian, 0.01% Pacific Islander, 1.02% from other races, and 1.26% from two or more races. Hispanic or Latino of any race were 3.69% of the population.

There were 5,766 households, out of which 36.39% had children under the age of 18 living with them, 64.46% were married couples living together, 4.06% had a male household with no wife present, 8.71% had a female householder with no husband present, and 22.77% were non-families. 18.21% of all households were made up of individuals, and 7.25% had someone living alone who was 65 years of age or older.  The average household size was 2.68 and the average family size was 3.05.

In the township, the population was spread out, with 27.74% under the age of 20, 4.36% from 20 to 24, 20.99% from 25 to 44, 33.87% from 45 to 64, and 13.04% who were 65 years of age or older.  The median age was 43.3 years. For every 100 females there were 98.72 males.  For every 100 females age 18 and over, there were 94.94 males age 18 and over. As of 2015, the median income for a household in the township was $75,714, and the median income for a family was $89,182. Males had a median income of $56,152 versus $43,855 for females. The per capita income for the township was $35,470.  About 4.1% of families and 4.8% of the population were below the poverty line, including 5.0% of those under age 18 and 9.1% of those age 65 or over.

Education

The township, along with South Whitehall and Upper Macungie townships, is served by the Parkland School District. Ironton, Kernsville, and Schnecksville Elementary Schools are located in North Whitehall and its secondary students attend Orefield Middle School and Parkland High School. North Whitehall Township is also home to Lehigh Carbon Community College in Schnecksville.

Transportation

Interstate 476 follows the Pennsylvania Turnpike's Northeast Extension along a northwest-southeast alignment across southern and western portions of North Whitehall Township, but the closest interchange is in neighboring South Whitehall Township. Numbered highways providing local access include Pennsylvania Route 309, Pennsylvania Route 873, Pennsylvania Route 329, and Pennsylvania Route 145. Another thoroughfare is Mauch Chunk Road, which runs from PA 329 in Ballietsville into Allentown. LANta serves the township with bus route 325 along the Route 309/873 corridor.

References

External links

Townships in Lehigh County, Pennsylvania
Townships in Pennsylvania